Perrey Reeves (born ) is an American film and television actress. She is best known for her recurring role as Melissa Gold on the television series Entourage from 2004 to 2011 and Frank the Tank's wife in the 2003 comedy Old School.

Early life
Reeves was born in New York City and raised in New Hampshire, the daughter of Dr. Alexander Reeves, a professor of medicine and anatomy at Dartmouth College. Reeves' paternal grandfather was sound pioneer Hazard E. Reeves, who introduced magnetic stereophonic sound to film.

Career
Reeves co-starred on the comedy series Entourage (2004–2011) as Mrs. Gold, the wife of Ari Gold. She also appeared (2009) in Rules of Engagement, Family Style, and in Grey's Anatomy. Other notable roles included Marissa opposite Will Ferrell in the film Old School and Jessie in the film Mr. and Mrs. Smith. She has had parts in American Dreamz, The X-Files, Kicking and Screaming, Escape to Witch Mountain, and Child's Play 3.

In 2014, Reeves appeared during the fifth and final season of Covert Affairs as the evil Caitlyn Cook. She reprised her role as Melissa Gold in the movie Entourage in 2015. She played also Nina Devon on the TV series Famous in Love.

Other ventures 
In 2012, Reeves moved to Costa Rica and started a yoga retreat in Cabuya named The Sanctuary at Two Rivers. She began practicing yoga in 1993 and practices the ancient Indian healthcare tradition, Ayurveda.

Personal life
From 1993 to 1995, Reeves was in a relationship with her X-Files co-star actor David Duchovny. In September 2014, Reeves became engaged to her boyfriend, tennis coach Aaron Fox. They wed on June 13, 2015.  In October 2017, their first child, a baby girl, was born.

Filmography

Film

Television

References

External links

Actresses from New York City
American film actresses
American television actresses
Living people
Actresses from New Hampshire
20th-century American actresses
21st-century American actresses
Year of birth missing (living people)